Georgios Pangalos (born 21 June 1936) is a Greek former sports shooter. He competed at the 1960, 1964 and 1968 Summer Olympics.

References

1936 births
Living people
Greek male sport shooters
Olympic shooters of Greece
Shooters at the 1960 Summer Olympics
Shooters at the 1964 Summer Olympics
Shooters at the 1968 Summer Olympics
Sportspeople from Alexandria
20th-century Greek people